Nandamuri Taraka Rama Rao (28 May 1923 – 18 January 1996), often referred to by his initials NTR, was an Indian actor, filmmaker and politician who served as Chief Minister of Andhra Pradesh for seven years over three terms. He starred in over 300 films, predominantly in Telugu cinema, and was referred by the media as Viswa Vikhyatha Nata Sarwa Bhouma. Rao received three National Film Awards for co-producing Thodu Dongalu (1954) and Seetharama Kalyanam (1960) under National Art Theater, Madras, and for directing Varakatnam (1970). Known for his breakthrough performances in Raju Peda (1954) and Lava Kusa (1963), Rao garnered the Nandi Award for Best Actor for Kodalu Diddina Kapuram in 1970, and the Inaugural Filmfare Award for Best Actor – Telugu in 1972 for Badi Panthulu.

Rao made his debut as an actor in a Telugu social film Mana Desam, directed by L. V. Prasad in 1949. He gained popularity in the 1950s when he became well known for his portrayals of Hindu deities, especially Krishna, Karna and Rama, roles which have made him a "messiah of the masses", and a prominent figure in the history of cinema. He later became known for portraying antagonistic characters and Robin Hood-esque hero characters in films. N. T. R. was voted "Greatest Indian Actor of All Time" in a CNN-IBN national poll conducted in 2013 on the occasion of the Centenary of Indian Cinema.

He starred in such films as Pathala Bhairavi (1951), the only south Indian film screened at the first International Film Festival of India, Malliswari (1951), featured at Peking Film Festival, Beijing, China, the enduring classics Mayabazar (1957) and Nartanasala (1963), featured at the Afro-Asian Film Festival that was held in Jakarta, Indonesia. All the four films were included in CNN-IBN's list of "100 greatest Indian films of all time". He co-produced Ummadi Kutumbam, nominated by Film Federation of India as one of its entries to the 1968 Moscow Film Festival. Besides Telugu, he has also acted in a few Tamil films. Widely recognised for his portrayal of mythological characters, Rao was one of the leading method actors of Indian cinema.

Rao was awarded the Padma Shri by the Government of India in 1968, recognizing his contribution to Indian cinema. After his career in films, Rao entered politics. He founded the Telugu Desam Party (TDP) in 1982 and served three tumultuous terms as Chief Minister of Andhra Pradesh between 1983 and 1995. He was known as an advocate of Andhra Pradesh's distinct cultural identity, distinguishing it from the erstwhile Madras State with which it was often associated. At the national level, he was instrumental in the formation of the National Front, a coalition of non-Congress parties which governed India from 1989 until 1990.

Early life
Nandamuri Taraka Rama Rao was born in a Hindu agrarian family on 28 May 1923 in Nimmakuru, a small village in Gudivada taluk of Krishna district, which was a part of the erstwhile Madras Presidency of British India. He was given in adoption to his paternal uncle because his uncle and aunt were childless. He was first educated by a teacher who came from a nearby village, whom he would attribute his command of Telugu to, as well as his father, an aspiring thespian and patron of the arts. Although children were normally pulled out of school after completing their primary education, on account of being the first male child in the family, his father sent him to Vijayawada, where he continued his education, matriculating in 1940 before studying at SRR & CVR College and at the Andhra Christian College in Guntur.  In 1947, he joined the Madras Service Commission as a sub-registrar at Prathipadu of Guntur district, a much-coveted job that he nevertheless quit within three weeks to devote himself to acting. He developed a baritone singing voice as a young man.

Personal life
In May 1943, at the age of 20, while still pursuing his Intermediate, Rao was married to Smt. Basava Rama Tarakam, the daughter of his maternal uncle. The marriage was blessed with twelve children; including eight sons and four daughters, namely: Ramakrishna Sr., Jayakrishna, Saikrishna, Harikrishna, Mohanakrishna, Balakrishna, Ramakrishna Jr., Jayashankarakrishna, Garapati Lokeswari (daughter), Daggubati Purandeswari (daughter), Nara Bhuvaneswari (daughter), and Kantamaneni Umamaheswari (daughter).

Smt. Basava Tarakam died of cancer in 1985. In her memory, Rao established the Basavatarakam Indo-American Cancer Hospital in Hyderabad in 1986. In 1993, NTR married Lakshmi Parvathi, a Telugu writer. The marriage was childless and lasted until NTR's death less than three years later. Lakshmi Parvati was the author of NTR's two-volume biography published in 2004. The first volume, Eduruleni Manishi, covers his childhood and his entry into films. The second volume, Telugu Tejam, deals with his political career.

NTR's eldest son, Nandamuri Ramakrishna Sr., died in 1962, soon after Rao completed shooting of the film Irugu Porugu. Rao founded the film studios Ramakrishna Studios in Nacharam in his memory. NTR's third son, Nandamuri Saikrishna, who was a theatre owner, died in 2004 following diabetic complications. His fourth son, Nandamuri Harikrishna, who died in a car accident on 29 August 2018, was a child actor-turned-politician elected to the Rajya Sabha, representing the TDP. Harikrishna's sons Nandamuri Kalyan Ram and N. T. Rama Rao Jr. are also actors in the Telugu cinema. NTR's sixth son, Nandamuri Balakrishna, has been one of the leading actors in Tollywood since the mid-1980s. He also started his career as a child artist. Balakrishna contested 2014 assembly elections as a TDP candidate. He won the Hindupur Assembly Constituency. His seventh son, Nandamuri Ramakrishna Jr. is a film producer.

NTR's third daughter, Bhuvaneshwari, is the wife of former chief minister Nara Chandrababu Naidu. NTR's second daughter, Daggubati Purandeswari, is a widely respected politician, who has represented the Indian National Congress in the Lok Sabha and served as a Union Minister. She later shifted her allegiance to the Bharatiya Janata Party. NTR's fourth and youngest daughter, Uma Maheswari, was found dead at her home in Hyderabad's Jubilee hills on 1 August 2022. According to Police, her death appears to be an instance of suicide, but no suicide note was found.

Film career

 
Rama Rao started his film career with a walk-on role as a policeman in Mana Desam (1949). Following this, he appeared in Palletoori Pilla (1950), directed by B. A. Subba Rao. His first mythological film was in 1957, where he portrayed the Hindu god Krishna in the blockbuster film Maya Bazaar. He played Krishna in 17 films, including some landmark films such as Sri Krishnarjuna Yudham (1962), the Tamil film Karnan (1964) and Daana Veera Soora Karna (1977). He was also known for his portrayal of the god Rama, essaying that role in films such as Lava Kusa (1963) and Sri Ramanjaneya Yuddham (1974) to name a few. He has also portrayed other characters from the Ramayana, such as Ravana in Bhookailas (1958) and Seetharama Kalyanam (1961) among others. He portrayed the god Vishnu in films such as Sri Venkateswara Mahatyam (1960) among others and the god Shiva in Dakshayagnam (1962). He has also enacted the roles of Mahabharata characters, such as Bheeshma, Arjuna, Karna and Duryodhana. 
 

Later in his career, he stopped playing a prince in his commercial films and began to play roles of a poor yet heroic young man fighting against the existing system. These films appealed to the sentiments of the common man. Some of these films are Devudu Chesina Manushulu (1973), Adavi Ramudu (1977), Driver Ramudu (1979), Vetagadu (1979), Sardar Papa Rayudu (1980), Kondaveeti Simham (1981), Justice Chowdary (1982) and Bobbili Puli (1982). He also portrayed fantasy roles, his notable film in that genre being Yamagola (1977). His film Lava Kusa, in which he starred as Rama, collected 1 crore in 1963. He directed and acted in the hagiographical film Srimadvirat Veerabrahmendra Swami Charitra (1984). He also acted in films such as Brahmashi Viswamitra (1991) and Major Chandrakanth (1993). His last film was Srinatha Kavi Sarvabhowmudu, a biopic on the Telugu poet Srinatha, which released in 1993.

 

In the later half of his career, Rao became a screenwriter. Despite having no formal training in scriptwriting, he authored several screenplays for his own movies as well as for other producers. He also produced many of his films as well as other actor's films through his film production house National Art Theater Private Limited, Madras and later Ramakrishna Studios, Hyderabad. He actively campaigned for the construction of a large number of cinemas through this production house. He was influential in designing and implementing a financial system that funded the production and distribution of movies. He was so dedicated to his profession that he would often learn new things in order to portray a particular character on-screen perfectly and realistically. At the age of 40, he learnt dance from the renowned Kuchipudi dancer Vempati Chinna Satyam for his role in the film Nartanasala (1963).

Political career
Naadendla Bhaskara Rao,a veteran politician joined Telugu Desam Party (TDP) founded by Rama Rao, on 29 March 1982 in Hyderabad. He said that this decision was based on a historic need to rid Andhra Pradesh of the corrupt and inept rule of the Indian National Congress, which had governed the state since its formation in 1956 and whose leadership had changed the Chief Minister five times in five years.

First term as Chief Minister, 1983

In the elections, the TDP allied with the Sanjaya Vichara Manch party and decided to field educated candidates who had a good name in the society and were not indulging in corruption, which was an innovative political concept at the time. Rao himself decided to contest from two assembly constituencies, Gudivada and Tirupati. He used many innovative ways of campaigning, such as being the first politician in India to use rath yatras for campaigning. However, it was MGR who had started the open top van campaigning for elections, as it was felt that he can address the roadshows as an alternative to the mammoth meetings, which involves large amount of money as well as manpower. For this, he used a modified Chevrolet van which was given the name of Chaitanya Ratham. In this, Rao travelled across the state of Andhra Pradesh, crisscrossing all the districts. With his son Nandamuri Harikrishna, also a film actor, driving the van, Rao notched up over 75,000 kilometres during his campaign, a distinctive sight with the van's yellow party flags and banners and Rao sitting on top of the vehicle hailing the crowds. He campaigned for restoring the dignity of the Telugu people and advocated forming a closer bond between the government and the common people, going into the elections with the slogan, Telugu Vari Atma Gauravam (lit. Telugu people's self-respect).

In the 1983 Andhra Pradesh Legislative Assembly election, TDP won by an absolute majority winning 202 out of the 294 seats in the state assembly, with Rao himself winning both the seats he contested. Their alliance with the Sanjaya Vichara Manch fetched 202 seats. Rao was sworn in as the 10th and the first non-Congress Chief Minister of the state on 9 January 1983 with ten cabinet ministers and five ministers of State.

Loss of power, 1984
On 15 August 1984, Rao was removed from office by the then Governor of Andhra Pradesh Thakur Ram Lal, while Rao was in the US to undergo open heart surgery. His finance minister, Nadendla Bhaskara Rao, a former Congressman, was made the Chief Minister by the Governor Thakur Ram Lal. Bhaskar Rao purportedly had the support of majority of the TDP MLAs which was never the case.

Return to power, 1984
Rama Rao returned to India immediately after his surgery, disputed the claims by Bhaskara Rao and demonstrated his strength by bringing all the MLAs supporting him, which was a majority in the 294 member assembly, to the Raj Bhavan (Governor's Office). Ramlal did not relent, as a result of which Rama Rao relaunched his Chaitanya Ratham campaign, this time campaigning for the restoration of democracy by mobilizing the support of people and various anti-Congress political parties in the country including the Janata Party (JP), the Bharatiya Janata Party (BJP), the Left Front, the Dravida Munnetra Kazhagam (DMK), and the National Conference (NC). During the one-month crisis, the MLAs supporting Rama Rao were secured in a secret place to avoid horse-trading. This was achieved with the support of Ramakrishna Hegde, Chief Minister of Karnataka. Ramakrishna Hegde moved all the TDP MLAs to a Budget Hotel, Das Prakash, in Mysuru (Mysore). As Congress (I) was known for poaching MLAs regularly and was felt necessitated. This was the first time in Indian Politics that MLAs were secured at a safe place from poaching. Also, due to mobilization of several political parties and the people and due to press, the Prime Minister Indira Gandhi unwillingly removed Governor Ramlal and appointed a Congress veteran, Shankar Dayal Sharma, as the governor of Andhra Pradesh to pave the way for restoring Rao.

Campaigning in Tamil Nadu, 1984
In 1984, when the then Chief Minister of Tamil Nadu and fellow actor M. G. Ramachandran (M.G.R.) was unable to campaign in the state assembly election due to his being hospitalized in the US. N.T.R., who was a close friend of M.G.R. and R. M. Veerappan who was handling the party affairs, campaigned for the All India Anna Dravida Munnetra Kazhagam (AIADMK), despite the fact that party was an ally of the Congress at the time. As leader of the National Front, he campaigned extensively for the constituent parties when they faced elections, again using his Chaitanya Ratham campaigning concept.

General elections, 1984

A month later, Indira Gandhi was assassinated and was succeeded as prime minister by her son, Rajiv Gandhi. In the ensuing national elections to the Lok Sabha, the Congress, riding on the sympathy wave caused by Gandhi's assassination, won convincingly all over the country except in Andhra Pradesh where the TDP secured a landslide victory. TDP became the first regional party to serve as the main opposition party in the Lok Sabha.

Second term as Chief Minister, 1985
Meanwhile, in the state, Rao recommended dissolution of the Assembly and called for fresh elections the following year in the state to ensure that the people had a fresh choice to elect their representatives. The TDP again won with a massive majority in those elections, with Rao winning from 3 seats; Hindupur, Nalgonda and Gudivada, thus marking the beginning of his second term as Chief Minister. Senior Leaders of the Congress in the state including former Chief Ministers Kasu Brahmananda Reddy and Kotla Vijaya Bhaskara Reddy lost in their constituencies of Narasaraopet and Kurnool respectively to the TDP. Rao completed his five-year term as Chief Minister.

Leader of opposition, 1989
In the December 1989 assembly elections however, he was voted out of power due to a wave of anti-incumbency sweeping the state as a result of which the Congress returned to power. Rao himself lost from Kalwakurthy by a narrow margin to the Congress, but retained the Hindupur assembly seat. During this time, he suffered a mild stroke, as a result of which he was unable to campaign, which, according to some political analysts and TDP supporters, was the reason for the TDP's loss.

National politics, 1989
During 1989, he established himself in national politics, forming a coalition of non-Congress parties opposed to the Congress known as the National Front. It included parties, besides the TDP, such as the Janata Dal, the DMK, the Asom Gana Parishad (AGP) and the Indian Congress (Socialist). This alliance governed India between 1989 and 1990 with support from the Left Front and the BJP. Meanwhile, Rao assumed the position as the Leader of Opposition in the state. His National Front government at the centre led by V. P. Singh was at the forefront of social justice by implementing the provisions in the Mandal Commission for providing 27% reservation for Other Backward Classes (OBC's).

Third term as Chief Minister, 1994
Rao returned to power for a third and final time in the December 1994 state assembly elections with his party in alliance with the Left Front. This alliance won 269 seats in the 294 seat Assembly, with the TDP alone winning 226. The Congress, which once again had multiple Chief Ministers in the state during its five-year rule between 1989 and 1994, won only 26 seats. Rao contested again from Hindupur and won the seat for the third consecutive time, achieving a rare hat-trick of wins from the same assembly constituency. He also won from another assembly constituency, Tekkali. Chandra Babu Naidu led a revolt in the party against Rao, showing his 2nd wife Lakshmi Parvathi's interference in the administration as a reason and that led to his becoming the CM on 1 September 1995 replacing Rao.

Awards and honors

Civilian honours

Other honours

Filmfare Awards South

Nandi Awards

National Film Awards

Legacy
The NTR National Award is a national award in honour of Rao. It was instituted in 1996 by the Government of Andhra Pradesh to recognise notable film personalities for their lifetime achievements and contributions to the Indian film industry. The NTR National Literary Award was instituted by the NTR Vignan Trust, as an annual award to recognise people for their lifetime achievements and contributions to Indian literature. Dr. N.T.R. University of Health Sciences, Vijayawada was established as University of Health Sciences by the Government of Andhra Pradesh and was inaugurated on 9 April by N. T. Rama Rao, the then Chief Minister of Andhra Pradesh in the city of Vijayawada, Andhra Pradesh, India. It started functioning on 1 November 1986. After the death of Rama Rao, it was decided to rename the university after him, and this was carried out on 2 February 1998. The university celebrated its silver jubilee from 1–3 November 2011.

His life and acting career, and later life and political career, are showcased in the films N.T.R: Kathanayakudu and N.T.R: Mahanayakudu, respectively, with his son Nandamuri Balakrishna playing the title character. His later life after his wife Nandamuri Basavatarakam's death and his marriage to Lakshmi Parvathi is showcased in Ram Gopal Varma's film Lakshmi's NTR with P. Vijay Kumar playing his role.

Legislative career

As Assembly member

Death
N T Rama Rao died of a heart attack on 18 January 1996 at his residence in Hyderabad, aged 72. He was cremated and his ashes were immersed at Srirangapatna by his second wife Lakshmi Parvathi, eight years later, in May 2004.

See also
 List of chief ministers of Andhra Pradesh
 Government of Andhra Pradesh
 Elections in Andhra Pradesh
 Politics of Andhra Pradesh
 Maverick Messiah, a 2021 book about Rao

References

Bibliography

External links

 
 Article on NTR in BBC Telugu

|-

|-

1923 births
1996 deaths
Andhra University alumni
Telugu film directors
Chief Ministers of Andhra Pradesh
V. P. Singh administration
People from Krishna district
Telugu male actors
Filmfare Awards South winners
Recipients of the Rashtrapati Award
20th-century Indian male actors
Indian actor-politicians
Telugu Desam Party politicians
Indian socialists
Indian political party founders
Telugu Desam Party
Chief ministers from Telugu Desam Party
Leaders of the Opposition in the Andhra Pradesh Legislative Assembly
Recipients of the Padma Shri in arts
Film directors from Andhra Pradesh
20th-century Indian film directors